Kanjeng Raden Tumenggung (K.R.T.) Radjiman Wedyodiningrat (21 April 1879 – 20 September 1952) was an Indonesian physician and one of the founding figures of the Indonesian Republic. He was a member of the Budi Utomo organization, in 1945 was elected to lead the Investigating Committee for Preparatory Work for Independence (BPUPK). On 9 August 1945, the day after the Atomic bombing of Nagasaki, Rajiman, along with nationalist figures Sukarno and Mohammad Hatta were flown to Saigon to meet with Field Marshall  Hisaichi Terauchi, the Japanese commander of the Southern Expeditionary Army Group.

In 1950, having become a member of the legislature, the People's Representative Council (DPR), he led its first plenary session. Two years later, Rajiman died and was buried in Yogyakarta. He was named a National Hero of Indonesia on 8 November 2013.

References